The Lion's Game is a 2000 novel by American author Nelson DeMille. It is the second of DeMille's novels to feature the detective John Corey, now working as a contractor for the fictional FBI Anti-Terrorist Task Force in New York City. The 2000 novel The Lion’s Game is the sequel to Plum Island and is followed by the 2004 book Night Fall. The book also briefly mentions events from other DeMille novels like The Charm School and The Gold Coast, that aren't strictly part of the Corey-universe.

Plot
"The Lion" will be landing. And at New York's JFK Airport, an elite American task force waits as the notorious Libyan terrorist prepares to defect to the West. Then, aboard Flight 175, something goes eerily, horribly wrong - a mere prelude to the terror that is to come. Ex-NYPD cop, now Task Force contract agent John Corey - together with his formidable and beautiful new partner, Kate Mayfield - will follow a trail of smoke and blood across the country. His quarry: a foe with the cunning of a man and all the bloodlust of a lion . To win a desperate game with no rules at all, Corey must invent a strategy that leaves room for no luck at all.

Film adaptation
According to the official Nelson DeMille website, a movie about The Lion's Game (and Plum Island) will be released. The rights to the novel were bought by Columbia Pictures in January 2000.

Critical reception
George Hackett, writer for The Press of Atlantic City, said that "for sheer suspense, there's nothing better than the opening of Nelson DeMille's latest thriller".

References

External links
 The Lion's Game on Nelson DeMille's Official Website

2000 American novels
Novels by Nelson DeMille
Novels set in New York City